Gyula Décsi (28 January 1919 - 18 September 1990) was a Hungarian politician and jurist, who served as Minister of Justice between 1952 and 1953 in the cabinet of Mátyás Rákosi.

References
 Rulers.org

1919 births
1990 deaths
Justice ministers of Hungary